Anthony Hampden Dickson (3 November 1935 – 29 November 2022) was a Jamaican clergyman and bishop for the Roman Catholic Diocese of Bridgetown. 

Dickson was born in Kingston, Jamaica on 3 November 1935. He became ordained in 1962, and appointed bishop in 1975. Dickson resigned in 1995.

Dickson died in Barbados on 29 November 2022, at the age of 87.

References

1935 births
2022 deaths
20th-century Roman Catholic bishops in Jamaica
21st-century Roman Catholic bishops in Jamaica
Roman Catholic bishops of Kingston in Jamaica
Jamaican Roman Catholic bishops
Catholic Church in Barbados
Roman Catholic bishops of Bridgetown
Bishops appointed by Pope Paul VI